Good Cop is a British police procedural television series, written and created by Stephen Butchard, that first broadcast on BBC One on 30 August 2012. The plot centres on an ordinary police constable, John Paul Rocksavage (Warren Brown), whose life changes forever when his best friend and colleague, Andy Stockwell (Tom Hopper), is attacked and killed in a savage ambush.

A single series of four episodes was broadcast weekly at 9:00pm on Thursdays from 30 August 2012. Following the shooting of two police officers in Tameside, Greater Manchester, on 18 September 2012, the BBC postponed the final episode, originally scheduled for Thursday 20 September at 9:00pm. The BBC announced on 28 September that the final episode would air on Saturday 13 October 2012, at a later timeslot of 10:30pm. Consequently, viewing figures for the final episode were much lower than the rest of the series.

The complete series was released on DVD on 15 October 2012, three weeks later than the expected date of 24 September 2012. The series was also released on Region 4 DVD in Australia on 5 June 2013. The BBC stated on 4 February 2013 that Good Cop would not return for a second series although no reason for the cancellation was given.

Plot
Good Cop is set in the city of Liverpool. It follows the work and private lives of John Paul Rocksavage (Warren Brown), a beat police constable working for the Liverpool Metropolitan police, who is partnered with long term friend Andy Stockwell (Tom Hopper).

At home, Rocksavage lives with his disabled father, Robert (Michael Angelis), and reads to him regularly when he is off duty. With each episode, he is reading a different book, all of which have some parallels to Rocksavage's own story. In the first episode, he reads an excerpt from Treasure Island; in the third, a chapter of the Invisible Man; and in the fourth, the first chapter of Crime and Punishment. Rocksavage is also having a secret affair with his dad's married carer, Justine (Christine Tremarco).

Outside of work, Rocksavage is trying to win back his ex-girlfriend, Cassandra (Aisling Loftus), who has returned from the United States with his six-year-old daughter, Libby. Cassandra has a new boyfriend, but Rocksavage struggles to accept this and with the help of his father, does all he can to be a part of Cassandra's life. Rocksavage is also mentoring a teenage informant, Kyle Smart (Shaun Mason), a car thief with a good ear for crimes taking place within the local community.

When Stockwell is attacked and killed in a savage ambush on a routine call out to a domestic disturbance, Rocksavage's life is changed forever. He finds himself partnered with rookie WPC Amanda Morgan (Kerrie Hayes), whom he takes his anger and resentment out on, whilst coming head-to-head with the chief of the Criminal Investigation Department (CID), DCI Craig Costello (Mark Womack), who is overseeing the investigation into Andy's death. After coming face to face with one of Stockwell's killers, Noel Finch (Stephen Graham), Rocksavage crosses the line from law enforcer to law breaker, and soon realises there is no way back.

Cast
 Warren Brown as PC John Paul Rocksavage
 Michael Angelis as Robert Rocksavage
 Tom Hopper as PC Andy Stockwell
 Kerrie Hayes as PC Amanda Morgan
 Mark Womack as DCI Craig Costello
 Philip Hill-Pearson as DC Liam Frainey
 Aisling Loftus as Cassandra Stanton
 Stephen Graham as Noel Finch
 Stephen Walters as Callum Rose
 Joe Macaulay as Jonjo Heinz
 Shaun Mason as Kyle Smart
 Christine Tremarco as Justine
 Johann Myers as PC Gary Walton
 Carl Rice as PC Phil Davenport
 Michael J. Tait as PC Darren Skinner
 Kevin Harvey as Sergeant Middleton
 Jodie Comer as Amy

Trivia
Jodie Comer has a small role in one episode as a waitress who is harassed by Stephen Graham's character. Impressed by Comer's performance, Graham recommended her to his agent, who agreed to represent her; seven years later, after winning the 2019 BAFTA Award for Best Actress for her performance in Killing Eve, Comer thanked Graham for being her mentor and introducing her to his agent.

Episodes

References

External links
 

2010s British police procedural television series
2012 British television series debuts
2012 British television series endings
2010s British television miniseries
BBC high definition shows
Television shows set in Liverpool
Television shows shot in Liverpool
English-language television shows